Maddalena Musumeci (born March 26, 1976 in Catania) is a female water polo centre back from Italy, who won the gold medal with the Women's National Team at the 2004 Summer Olympics in Athens, Greece.

See also
 Italy women's Olympic water polo team records and statistics
 List of Olympic champions in women's water polo
 List of Olympic medalists in water polo (women)
 List of world champions in women's water polo
 List of World Aquatics Championships medalists in water polo

References

External links
 

1976 births
Living people
Sportspeople from Catania
Italian female water polo players
Water polo centre backs
Water polo players at the 2004 Summer Olympics
Water polo players at the 2008 Summer Olympics
Medalists at the 2004 Summer Olympics
Olympic gold medalists for Italy in water polo
World Aquatics Championships medalists in water polo
21st-century Italian women